The Wonalancet River is a  river in the White Mountains of New Hampshire in the United States. Named after the 17th-century Pennacook sachem Wonalancet, it is a tributary of the southern Swift River, part of the Bearcamp River / Ossipee Lake / Saco River watershed leading to the Atlantic Ocean.

The Wonalancet River rises in the heart of the Sandwich Range, in "The Bowl", a forested glacial cirque lying between Mount Whiteface to the west, Mount Passaconaway to the north, and Mount Wonalancet to the east. The river flows south, paralleled by the Dicey Mill Trail, out of the mountains into the communities of Ferncroft, in the southwest corner of the town of Albany, and Wonalancet, in the northwest corner of the town of Tamworth.

See also

List of rivers of New Hampshire

References

Rivers of New Hampshire
Rivers of Grafton County, New Hampshire
Rivers of Carroll County, New Hampshire
New Hampshire placenames of Native American origin